Carroll is a city in, and the county seat of, Carroll County, Iowa, United States, along the Middle Raccoon River. The population was 10,321 in the 2020 census.

History 
Carroll was laid out in 1867.  It took its name from Carroll County, which was named in honor of Charles Carroll of Carrollton, Maryland. He was the only Roman Catholic to sign the Declaration of Independence.

In 1869, the centrally located railroad town of Carroll City was selected as the county seat, replacing, with some protest, Carrollton. Later a $4,000 courthouse was constructed on the town square. This building was used until it burned to the ground in 1886. The vaults and records were undamaged, however, and moved to temporary housing in the Joyce Building and Drees' Music Hall.

The following winter a $40,000 bond issue was approved toward the construction of a new, permanent courthouse. The stone-and-brick building was built on the northwest corner of the square (the parking lot of the current courthouse). The courthouse, complete with a clock-tower, was used for more than three-quarters of a century, then replaced by a modern-looking building in 1965.

A $750,000 bond issue was used to construct and equip the new courthouse. This building was officially dedicated on September 24, 1966. The highlight of the dedication ceremony was the opening of the boxes sealed in the cornerstone of the old courthouse. The bell from the previous courthouse clock tower sits on the courthouse grounds.

Geography 
Carroll is located at  (42.069544, −94.866361).

Climate

According to the Köppen Climate Classification system, Carroll has a hot-summer humid continental climate, abbreviated "Dfa" on climate maps.

Demographics

2010 census
At the 2010 census there were 10,103 people, 4,357 households, and 2,605 families living in the city. The racial makeup of the city was 96.0% White, 0.5% African American, 0.1% Native American, 0.7% Asian, 1.5% from other races, and 1.3% from two or more races. Hispanic or Latino of any race were 2.4%.

Of the 4,357 households 28.6% had children under the age of 18 living with them, 47.7% were married couples living together, 9.0% had a female householder with no husband present, 3.1% had a male householder with no wife present, and 40.2% were non-families. 35.5% of households were one person and 16.7% were one person aged 65 or older. The average household size was 2.25 and the average family size was 2.91.

The median age was 42 years. 23.9% of residents were under the age of 18; 6.9% were between the ages of 18 and 24; 22.7% were from 25 to 44; 26.7% were from 45 to 64; and 19.7% were 65 or older. The gender makeup of the city was 47.1% male and 52.9% female.

2000 census
At the 2000 census there were 10,106 people, 4,173 households, and 2,649 families living in the city. The racial makeup of the city was 98.57% White, 0.18% African American, 0.10% Native American, 0.51% Asian, 0.28% from other races, and 0.37% from two or more races. Hispanic or Latino of any race were 0.57%.

Of the 4,173 households 31.8% had children under the age of 18 living with them, 51.7% were married couples living together, 8.9% had a female householder with no husband present, and 36.5% were non-families. 31.9% of households were one person and 16.2% were one person aged 65 or older. The average household size was 2.36 and the average family size was 2.99.

Population spread: 25.9% under the age of 18, 8.0% from 18 to 24, 26.0% from 25 to 44, 20.4% from 45 to 64, and 19.7% 65 or older. The median age was 39 years. For every 100 females, there were 89.5 males. For every 100 females age 18 and over, there were 85.1 males.

The median household income was $39,854 and the median family income  was $51,020. Males had a median income of $31,124 versus $22,215 for females. The per capita income for the city was $20,442. About 3.4% of families and 5.2% of the population were below the poverty line, including 3.8% of those under age 18 and 7.4% of those age 65 or over.

Education 
The public school district is the Carroll Community School District.

The area Catholic private school is the Kuemper Catholic School System, which includes Kuemper Catholic High School.

Notable people 

 Mary Arnold, singer with the rock group Kenny Rogers and The First Edition, wife of Roger Miller
 Joel Bolger, former Chief Justice of the Alaska Supreme Court
Lance Cade, professional wrestler
 Adam Haluska, professional basketball player
 Arthur Neu, Lieutenant Governor of Iowa, 1973 - 1979
 Ken Henderson (born 1946) Major League Baseball player from 1965–1980
 Mary Lundby (1948–2009) Former Iowa State Senator District 18
Matthew McDermott, Associate Justice of the Iowa Supreme Court
 Tony Bernard Mosman (1886–1985), painter
 Nick Nurse, head basketball coach for the Toronto Raptors, and 2019 NBA Champion
 Everett Rogers  communication scholar
 Carl O. Wegner, Minnesota state legislator and lawyer
 Joe Slade White, Democratic media consultant

Tourism

 Carroll Family Aquatic Center
 Sauk Rail Trail
 Carroll Historical Museum  
 Municipal Golf Course
 Skate Park
 Carroll Athletic Field
 Swan Lake State Park
 Merchants Park

References

External links

 
Official Carroll Web Site
Carroll Chamber of Commerce

 
Cities in Carroll County, Iowa
Cities in Iowa
County seats in Iowa
Populated places established in 1867
1867 establishments in Iowa